Eupithecia haworthiata, or Haworth's pug, is a moth of the family Geometridae. The species was first described by Henry Doubleday in 1856. It occurs in the Alps up to 1800 meters, in the Apennines up to 1400 metres and in the Balkan mountains up to 1500 m above sea level.

The wingspan is 12–14 mm. The ground colour of the forewings is grey brown. The crosslines are in pairs. A central spot is missing. There is a faint discal stain on the hindwings. The colour of the first abdominal segments is strongly yellow, orange or reddish. 

The moths flies from April to August depending on the location.

The caterpillars feed on Clematis vitalba and cultivated Clematis species.The pupa hibernates and often 2 or even 3 winters are passed in this state.

Subspecies
Eupithecia haworthiata haworthiata
Eupithecia haworthiata transsylvanaria (Dannehl, 1933)

Similar species
Eupithecia plumbeolata 
Eupithecia valerianata 
but neither of these have a reddish or yellow tinge to the basal segments of the abdomen.

References

External links
Kimber, Ian "70.146 BF1813 Haworth's Pug Eupithecia haworthiata Doubleday, 1856". UKMoths. Retrieved April 29, 2019.
"Eupithecia haworthiata Doubleday, 1856". Fauna Europaea. Retrieved April 29, 2019.
"08477 Eupithecia haworthiata Doubleday, 1856 - Waldreben-Blütenspanner". Lepiforum e.V. Retrieved April 29, 2019.
"Bosrankdwergspanner Eupithecia haworthiata". De Vlinderstichting. Retrieved April 29, 2019. 

Moths described in 1856
haworthiata
Moths of Europe
Moths of Asia